Statistics of Empress's Cup in the 1988 season.

Overview
It was contested by 16 teams, and Yomiuri SC Beleza won the championship.

Results

1st Round
Yomiuri SC Beleza 10-0 Toyama Ladies SC
FC PAF 0-2 Hyogo University of Teacher Education
Nissan FC 8-0 Nagoya Ladies FC
Uwajima Minami High School 0-3 Kobe FC
Shimizudaihachi SC 4-0 Molten Habatake
Miyagi Hirose Club 0-0 (pen 2-3) Sagamihara LSC
Takatsuki FC 2-1 Kumamoto Akita
Hatsukaichi High School 0-4 Shinko Seiko FC Clair

Quarterfinals
Yomiuri SC Beleza 3-0 Hyogo University of Teacher Education
Nissan FC 1-0 Kobe FC
Shimizudaihachi SC 5-0 Sagamihara LSC
Takatsuki FC 1-0 Shinko Seiko FC Clair

Semifinals
Yomiuri SC Beleza 5-0 Nissan FC
Shimizudaihachi SC 0-3 Takatsuki FC

Final
Yomiuri SC Beleza 2-0 Takatsuki FC
Yomiuri SC Beleza won the championship.

References

Empress's Cup
1988 in Japanese women's football